In mathematics, the Gross–Koblitz formula, introduced by  expresses a Gauss sum using a product of values of the p-adic gamma function. It is an analog of the Chowla–Selberg formula for the usual gamma function. It implies the Hasse–Davenport relation and generalizes the Stickelberger theorem.
 gave another proof of the Gross–Koblitz formula (Boyarski being a pseudonym of Bernard Dwork), and 
 gave an elementary proof.

Statement

The Gross–Koblitz formula states that the Gauss sum τ can be given in terms of the p-adic gamma function Γp by

where
 q is a power pf  of a prime p
r is an integer with 0 ≤ r < q–1
 r(i) is the integer whose base p expansion is a cyclic permutation of the f digits of r by i positions
 sp(r) is the sum of the digits of r in base p
 , where the sum is over roots of 1 in the extension Qp(π)
π satisfies πp – 1 = –p
ζπ is the pth root of 1 congruent to 1+π mod π2

References

 

Theorems in algebraic number theory